Elpida Grigoriadou (born 24 August 1971, in Thessaloniki) is a Greek rower. She competed in the 2003 World Rowing Championships winning a bronze medal in the lightweight women's double sculls alongside Angeliki Gkremou.

References

External links

1971 births
Greek female rowers
Rowers from Thessaloniki
World Rowing Championships medalists for Greece
Living people